Wigan bus station is a bus station located in the town of Wigan, in Greater Manchester, England. It is run by Transport for Greater Manchester.

Services
The majority of services that serve Wigan Bus Station are run by Stagecoach Manchester, following their takeover of First Greater Manchester's Wigan depot in December 2012. Other operators that serve the bus station include Arriva North West, Preston Bus, Diamond Bus North West, and Stagecoach Merseyside & South Lancashire.

There are frequent buses running to Bolton, Chorley, Ormskirk, St Helens and Skelmersdale plus several parts of the Wigan area, such as Ashton-in-Makerfield, Hindley, Shevington, Leigh, Pemberton, Golborne, Appley Bridge and Standish. Buses also run to Manchester, Preston, Southport, the Trafford Centre and Warrington.

Although there are several Nightbus services, which operate to areas around the town and to Leigh, these services do not serve the bus station and depart from outside Wigan North Western railway station instead.

Redevelopment

In July 2017, it closed for redevelopment with the bus stands temporarily being located around the town centre. The old bus stands were demolished and a new station was built on the same site, the project cost £15.7 million supported by the UK Government through the Greater Manchester Local Growth Deal programme. The bus station opened in October 2018, two months ahead of schedule. The new station added a new covered waiting area with better passenger comfort and security with increased retail space, new toilets and covered cycle parking. The development also has eco-friendly initiatives such as solar panels and the planting of wildflowers. Accessibility was also improved for people with physical disabilities and for the blind and partially sighted.

History

The original bus station was demolished in the 1980s during a redevelopment of the town centre which also included the construction of the Galleries Shopping Centre, work started in 1985 and it opened in November 1987. The station's facilities were also improved in 2001 with a £150,000 upgrade.

Location
The station is located opposite the Galleries and well connected to the town centre with pedestrian and cycle routes. It is further connected to the wider area being around 400 yards away from the Wigan train stations of Wigan North Western and Wigan Wallgate.

External links

Wigan Bus Station Departures - Transport for Greater Manchester
Album of historical photographs of the bus station - Wigan World

References

Bus stations in Greater Manchester
Buildings and structures in Wigan